Beam of Light is the second studio album from Dutch singer Patricia Paay, which was released by EMI in 1975.

Background
In 1975, Paay returned to working as a solo artist after spending two years as the lead singer of the Dutch music band Heart, who were signed to the EMI-Bovema label. When they disbanded in 1975, Paay remained signed to EMI to relaunch her solo career, whereas the rest of Heart signed to Ariola under the new name Limousine. Paay soon went to England to record Beam of Light at Abbey Road Studios, with Steve Harley as the producer, who at the time was in a relationship with Paay's sister, Yvonne Keeley. The album was recorded with contributions from members of Cockney Rebel, primarily Jim Cregan on guitar and Duncan Mackay on keyboards. Bassist George Ford and drummer Stuart Elliott play on three tracks, while others feature Herbie Flowers on bass and Tony Newman on drums.

In addition to producing the album, Harley had Paay record a version of Cockney Rebel's 1973 song "Sebastian", as well as one of his newly penned songs, "Understand". Steve Harley and Cockney Rebel also recorded their "Understand" during the summer of 1975 for their fourth studio album Timeless Flight. Paay contributes backing vocals on Cockney Rebel's recording of the track.

Release
Beam of Light was released in the Netherlands and Germany in 1975, and in the UK in 1976. "Can You Please Crawl Out Your Window" was released as the album's first single in the UK, the Netherlands and Belgium in 1975. "Children Come Home" was released as the second and final single in the Netherlands only in 1976. When the album and its singles did not generate commercial success, Paay opted to adopt a disco-orientated sound and would go on to achieve chart success in the Netherlands.

In 2006, EMI released Beam of Light for the first time on CD, as part of a four-album set together with Paay's other EMI albums The Lady Is a Champ (1977), Malibu Touch (1978) and Playmate (1981).

Critical reception
On its release in the UK, Alan Harris of the Burton Observer & Chronicle praised the album as "excellent" and a "fine package", with Paay presenting herself as a "strong vocal talent". He wrote, "Paay's voice is clear and sweet, yet powerful, enabling her to sail majestically through tracks such as Bob Dylan's 'Can You Please Crawl Out Your Window', Led Zeppelin's 'Stairway to Heaven' and Ian Samwell's 'Love Where Are You Now That I Need You'." Harris added that Harley had produced the album "with a high degree of skill", leaving "one [with] visions of a female Harley droning through the nine tracks". He described "Understand" as "classy", "Sebastian" as "haunting" and "Tiger and a Lion" as the album's only disappointing track. Ramsay Smith of the Aberdeen Evening Express was critical of the release, writing, "This album should be in mint condition well into the 21st century. The only good moments on it (and there aren't many) belong to Harley who produced it – though I'm not sure why he bothered."

Track listing

Personnel
 Jim Cregan – guitars (tracks 1–7, 9), backing vocals (tracks 3, 6, 9)
 Duncan Mackay – keyboards (tracks 1–7, 9)
 Herbie Flowers – bass (tracks 1–2, 4–5, 7)
 George Ford – bass (tracks 3, 6, 9), backing vocals (tracks 3, 6, 9)
 Tony Newman – drums (tracks 1–2, 4–5, 7)
 Stuart Elliott – drums (tracks 3, 6, 9)
 Yvonne Keeley – backing vocals (tracks 3, 6, 9)
 Barry St. John – backing vocals (tracks 3, 6, 9)
 Andrew Powell – arranger (track 8)

Production
 Steve Harley – producer
 Tony Clark – engineer

Other
 Peter Shepherd – sleeve design

References

1975 debut albums
EMI Records albums